Frigeri is a surname. Notable people with the surname include:

Lucas Frigeri (born 1989), Brazilian footballer
Rodolfo Frigeri (1941–2015), Argentine economist and politician

See also
Frigerio